John Baldwin Gourley (born June 12, 1981) is an American musician, singer, and songwriter from Alaska. He is the lead singer and rhythm guitarist of the rock band Portugal. The Man, with the hit song "Feel It Still". Gourley was previously the lead singer in post-hardcore band, Anatomy of a Ghost. Gourley is also a visual artist, who often uses the alias The Fantastic The.

Life and career

Gourley was born in 1981 in Willow, Alaska, to John T. Gourley and Jennifer Van Ingen. He and his two siblings grew up in Alaska moving from town to town, wherever their father's contracting business took the family. Gourley's parents both competed in the Iditarod, and for a while the family lived in a remote "off the grid" cabin accessible only by dogsled. He grew up helping to take care of dozens of mushing dogs.

He attended Wasilla High School, but dropped out at age 15 to study at home and work in construction with his father.
Gourley joined four fellow Wasilla musicians: his best friend Zach Carothers and the three members of band Nice Guy Eddie (Dewey Halpaus, Joe Simon, and Nick Simon), to form punk band Anatomy of a Ghost in 2002. They toured across the country and released their album Evanesce in October 2003 on Fearless Records. In the spring of 2003, Gourley recorded vocals for the song "Motelroom.Grandpiano" with the band Fear Before on their first album, Odd How People Shake. The members of Anatomy of a Ghost wanted to pursue their own ideas, however, so the band split up in May 2004. Gourley and bassist Carothers formed Portugal. The Man.

Gourley and longtime partner and bandmate Zoe Manville have a daughter born in 2011.

References

Further reading

External links

Musicians from Alaska
Living people
People from Wasilla, Alaska
1981 births
Musicians from Portland, Oregon
American male singer-songwriters
Grammy Award winners
21st-century American singers
21st-century American male singers
American singer-songwriters